The Fountain is a graphic novel illustrated by Kent Williams published in 2005 by Vertigo Comics, based on the original script of Darren Aronofsky's film The Fountain.

The graphic novel was a way to salvage something from the film project, whose first production was cancelled. As Aronofsky said: "I knew it was a hard film to make and I said at least if Hollywood fucks me over at least I'll make a comic book out of it".  Later, the film project was resurrected by Warner Bros.

Plot summary 
An army of Spanish soldiers is searching for the Tree of Life. Father Avila feels that their long journey is about to serve its purpose when he notices that a symbol on a blade he is carrying matches a symbol drawn in the sky, as well as on the ground. He presumes this must be the location of the Mayan temple that houses the Tree of Life. The soldiers accompanying him are reluctant and feel that his theories will only add to the loss of soldiers they have had.

The soldiers begin their assault on the temple only to be met by the Mayan warriors who are protecting the temple. Father Avila advances up the temple and is met by a Mayan priest who slowly emerges from the temple.

Dr. Thomas Creo is fatigued, sitting at a computer. He is about to perform surgery on a monkey that has a tumor. His colleagues tell him the surgery is canceled and they are going to euthanize the animal. Thomas brings up an ethnobotanical compound from Guatemala that he insists be injected into the animal. He opens his text and points to a tree. Against his colleagues' objections, the monkey is injected with the sap.
 
The story cuts to the woman from the tree and the seed she carries. She walks in the snow to the grave of "Izzi Creo". She buries the seed in the snow next to her grave.

Characters 
16th century
 Captain Tomas Verde
 Father Avila
 Ariel
 Mayan Priest - Lord of Xibalba
 Queen Isabel
 Silecio the Inquisitor
 The Franciscan
 Captain Rivera

Present
 Dr. Tommy Creo
 Izzi
 Antonio
 Dr. Lillian Guzetti
 Dr. Lipper
 Betty
 Donovan (Monkey)
 Tom
 Woman ("Izzi")

Reception

Writing for IGN, Hilary Goldstein called the comic a "must-have", concluding: "Aronofsky has succeeded, at least in one medium, of providing an incredible journey of love and loss across the centuries".

See also 

 List of comics based on films

Notes

References

External links

2005 books
2005 comics debuts
2005 graphic novels
Fantasy comics
Comics based on films
Vertigo Comics graphic novels
Works by Darren Aronofsky